Knyaz (Prince) Andrey Mikhailovich Kurbsky (1528–1583) was a Russian political figure, military leader, and political philosopher, known as an intimate friend and then a leading political opponent of the Russian tsar Ivan the Terrible. His correspondence with the tsar provides a unique source for the history of 16th-century Russia.

Andrey Kurbsky belonged to a family of Rurikid princes, which took its name from the town of Kurba near Yaroslavl. At an early age, he gained renown for courage displayed in the annual campaigns against Kazan. During the decisive siege of Kazan in 1552 he commanded the right flank of the Russian army and was wounded. Two years later, he defeated the Udmurt rebels and became a boyar. At that time, Kurbsky became one of the closest associates and advisors to the Tsar.

During the Livonian War of 1558-1583, Kurbsky led the Russian troops against the Livonian fortress of Dorpat (in Russian sources Yuryev; today Tartu, Estonia), and was victorious (1558). After Ivan failed to renew his commission, Kurbsky defected to Lithuania on April 30, 1564, citing impending repressions as his reason. Later the same year he led a  Polish-Lithuanian army against Russia and devastated the region of Velikie Luki. As a reward, Sigismund II August, king of the Polish–Lithuanian Commonwealth, gave him the town of Kovel in Volhynia (Ukraine), where he lived peacefully, defending his Orthodox subjects from Polish encroachments. Kurbsky thus became the first Russian political emigre.

Kurbsky is best remembered for a series of vitriolic letters he exchanged with the Tsar between 1564 and 1579. In 1573, he wrote a political pamphlet, which voiced the former independent princeling's disapproval of Ivan's slide towards  absolutism. In his writings, Kurbsky blames the tsar for a number of pathologically cruel crimes, but historians still disagree as to whether his claims should be given credit. Kurbsky's language is remarkable for an abundance of foreign loan-words, especially from Latin, which he had mastered abroad.

Prince Kurbsky often supported the opposition to the regime. Grandson of Semyon Ivanovich Kurbsky was married to the daughter of a disgraced Prince Andrew of the Uglich. Kurbsky support in the struggle for the throne, not Vasily III, and grandson, Dmitri, even more than earned the dislike of Moscow's rulers.

Dmitri's son Prince Kurbsky (Krupski) converted from Orthodoxy to Catholicism. And he left progeny in Belarus.
 
A dramatized account of his life, in which he is depicted as the second-most powerful aristocrat in Russia (second only to the Tsar) who is constantly put under pressure by boyars who want to make him revolt against the imperial authority at Moscow, can be found in the epic 1944 work of Soviet film-director Sergei Eisenstein, Ivan the Terrible.

References

External links
genealogy (Андрей Михайлович Курбский) (in Russian)
Correspondence of Ivan IV and Kurbsky (in Russian)
Kurbsky's History of the Grand Prince of Moscow (in Russian)

Tsardom of Russia people
Russian letter writers
Rurikids
1528 births
1583 deaths